FL Studio Mobile is a digital audio workstation available for Android, iOS and Windows UWP.

The program allows for the creation of complete multi-track music projects, which can then be exported in WAV, MP3 and MIDI formats, to work with other digital audio workstations, or in .FLM project format to be opened in FL Studio 10.0.5  or later. Various features include a step sequencer, piano roll, keyboard, drum pad, track editor, effects, and 133 sampled instruments including synths and drum kits. Instruments can also be added as .zip or .instr files.

Release
On June 21, 2011, Image-Line released FL Studio Mobile and FL Studio Mobile HD, versions of their Windows digital audio workstation FL Studio. FL Studio Mobile was designed by Artua and developed in cooperation with the makers of Music Studio. Image-Line released the program at an introductory price of $15.99 ($19.99 for the HD version), and both versions are available for download at the App Store.  In November/December 2016 Image-Line released FL Studio Mobile 3 on the Android (Google Play Store) then iOS (Apple App Store) and finally Windows (Windows App Store). FL Studio Mobile 3 was a completely new application developed in-house at Image-Line, replacing the existing FL Studio Mobile 2, Artua developed version. The price was revised downward to US$14.99.

FL Studio Mobile 1.0 is compatible with devices that operate iOS 3.1.3 or later, specifically all iPhones and iPod Touch models. iPad 1 and iPad 2 can run either FL Studio Mobile or FL Studio Mobile HD, and the HD version requires iOS 4.2 or later. The iPhone 4 version includes Retina Display support.

Features
Track editor
The program has a track editor mode that supports 99 layered tracks. Features include adding, duplicating, and deleting tracks, changing the track's instruments, setting song signature and tempo, an effect bus setting, a pan knob, a volume fader, and mute and solo buttons.

Piano roll editor
The piano roll editor allows for manually drawing notes, selecting multiple notes by dragging a rectangle, changing the length of multiple notes at once, setting note volume, and moving, duplicating, and quantizing notes.

Step sequencer
The step sequencer allows for recording one measure of a melody or beat at a time, then turning it into a loop. It allows for the creation of multiple sounds in one instrument track, and adjusting the pitch and velocity of each individual step.

Keyboard and drum pad

The keyboard feature is both resizable and stackable, allowing for 5 simultaneous touches, and 10 touches on the iPad. It has 3 key label modes, fullscreen support, melody and loop recording, two device orientations, and a fully configurable metronome. Pitch-bend and velocity can be applied to notes entered with the keyboard, drum pads or the piano-roll editor. The non-HD version is compatible with the Akai SynthStation 25, a plug-in piano keyboard for iPhone and iPod Touch.

Instruments
Version 1.0 comes built in with 133 sampled instruments, which cover musical styles such as classical, jazz, rock, electronic, and others. There are synths and drum kits included, as well as Slicex Loops. Pitchbend can be controlled with device tilt. iOS, and therefore FL Studio Mobile, does not support VST plugins. As of version 1.1, user instruments can be created using .instr and .zip files.

Effects
Version 1.0 comes with 5 real-time effects, including reverb, delay to create echo, equalizer, amp simulator with two overdrive types, and filter with resonance and optional tilt control. There is also a limiter for song volume. Effects can be turned on or off on an individual channel or applied to an entire project.

Importing, exporting
Version 1.0 doesn't support importing samples, though Image-Line has announced that future updates will incorporate the feature. The program supports iTunes file sharing, and audio can be exported in WAV and MIDI formats so they can be worked on in other digital audio workstations. Projects can be saved in .FLM format and then loaded onto Microsoft Windows to be opened with FL Studio version 10.0.5. or later. This can be done either on a Windows PC running FL studio natively, or an Apple computer using either Boot Camp or virtualization.

Version history

FL Studio Mobile 

FL Studio Mobile 3 was released on the Google Play Store on October 25, 2016. The iOS and Windows UWP versions were released two months later.

See also

Sytrus

References

External links

Audio editors
Digital audio workstation software
Music looping
2011 software
Music production software
Soundtrack creation software
IOS software
FL Studio